Charles Alexandre Giron (2 April 1850, Geneva - 9 June 1914, Genthod) was a Swiss painter and art critic. He specialized in portraits and scenes with figures; some of them mildly humorous.

Biography 
His father, Antoine-Alexandre Giron, was a Catholic from Spain, who came to Switzerland via Sardinia. His mother, Marie Henriod, was a Huguenot from Neuchâtel.

Initially, he was apprenticed to an enameler, but decided to become an artist instead. He began by taking lessons from François Diday and Barthélemy Menn in Geneva. In 1872, he went to Paris, where he frequented the Hôtel de Nice, a boarding house on the  that was home to some painters from Switzerland. Later, he shared several studios with Max Leenhardt. His first exhibition at the Salon came in 1876 and consisted mostly of landscapes. Eventually, he found a position in the studios of Alexandre Cabanel at the École des Beaux-Arts.

During his time in France, he travelled extensively, visiting England, the Netherlands and Italy. A planned tour of India, sponsored by the Maharajah of Baroda, failed to materialize. He was awarded the Order of Leopold in 1887 and, the following year, was named a Chevalier in the Legion of Honor. In 1891, he married Jeanne Antoinette Forget; the daughter of a merchant. They had three children. Their daughter, Simone, married into the noble 

After being active in Paris and Cannes, he and his family returned to Switzerland in 1896 and lived in several locations before settling in Genthod. In his capacity as an art critic, he came to the defense of Ferdinand Hodler, when Hodler's controversial proposal for frescoes in the Weapons Room at the Swiss National Museum was rejected. He sat on the admissions jury for the Exposition Universelle (1900). In 1901, he created murals for the National Council in Berne. In 1913, he suffered a stroke that left him unable to paint.

Two major retrospectives have been held: Zürich/Geneva in 1920 and Berne in 1955. A street in Geneva is named after him.

Selected paintings

Further reading 
 Claudia Jacqueline Villa, Charles Giron, mémoire licence à Genève, 1997, with a list of his works

External links

 
 
 More works by Giron @ ArtNet

1850 births
1914 deaths
Swiss painters
Swiss portrait painters
Swiss art critics